The 2019–20 FA WSL season (also known as the Barclays FA Women's Super League for sponsorship reasons) was the ninth edition of the FA Women's Super League (WSL) since it was formed in 2010. It was the second season after the rebranding of the four highest levels in English women's football and the twelve teams contesting the season was the greatest number in the league's history to date, following a steady increase from the original eight. It is the first under the new Barclays title sponsorship following a landmark multi-million pound investment.

On 13 March 2020, in line with the FA's response to the coronavirus pandemic, it was announced the season was initially suspended until at least 3 April 2020. After further postponements, the season was ultimately ended prematurely on 25 May 2020 with immediate effect. On 5 June 2020, Chelsea were named as champions, moving them up one place ahead of Manchester City on sporting merit after The FA Board's decision to award places on a points-per-game basis. Manchester City were awarded the second Champions League place and Liverpool were relegated using the same method.

Teams
After the WSL's restructure going into the 2018–19 season, membership of the league returned solely to performance in the previous season, though the league expanded from eleven teams to twelve as Manchester United and Tottenham Hotspur were both promoted after finishing first and second respectively in the Championship during the 2018–19 season, while only Yeovil Town were relegated.

Stadium changes 
In response to the record viewing figures during the 2019 FIFA Women's World Cup, three select fixtures were initially moved to Premier League grounds: The Manchester derby at the City of Manchester Stadium, Chelsea v Tottenham at Stamford Bridge and the North London derby at Tottenham Hotspur Stadium. In total, eight of the twelve teams have moved FA WSL fixtures to the larger grounds of their men's affiliate teams: Bristol City later announced their opening game would be played at Ashton Gate, Reading moved one of their league fixtures (as well as all three League Cup games) to the Madjeski Stadium and West Ham announced they would host Spurs at the London Stadium. Brighton & Hove Albion moved their match against Birmingham to the Falmer Stadium to coincide with the FA's Women's Football Weekend, held during a men's international break. Liverpool later moved their Merseyside derby, held on the same weekend, to Anfield and Everton scheduled the reverse fixture in February at Goodison Park (the match was ultimately left unplayed when the season was suspended and then cancelled).

After originally planning to permanently relocate to their new Walton Hall Park stadium in October 2019 following their opening two home games, delays meant Everton had to postpone the move until February 2020 and eventually scheduled six of their 11 home league games at Haig Avenue in Southport.

Personnel and kits

Managerial changes

League table

Results

Season statistics

Top scorers

Top assists

Clean sheets

Records 
The match between Arsenal and Bristol City on 1 December 2019 ended 11–1, setting a new WSL record scoreline, surpassing the 9–0 win of Liverpool Ladies over Doncaster Rovers Belles in 2013.

Awards

Monthly awards

Annual awards

Prize money
An FA WSL prize fund was put in place for the first time, following the new Barclay's sponsorship deal, with the entire pot totaling £500,000. The money was awarded in decreasing increments with the champions winning £100,000 and the last placed team being awarded £6,000.

See also
2019–20 FA Women's League Cup
2019–20 FA Women's Championship (tier 2)
2019–20 FA Women's National League (tier 3 & 4)

References

External links
Official website

Women's Super League seasons
1
FA WSL
England